Metroxylon amicarum (amicarium Latin – 'of friends' also known as the Caroline ivory-nut palm) is a species of flowering plant in the family Arecaceae, endemic to the Caroline Islands. It was named for the Friendly Islands, now Tonga, from where it was first thought to have descended. It is the only species in the Metroxylon genus which is not hapaxanthic.

Description
Unlike its monocarpic relatives, this species has a narrow inflorescence which develops within the leaf-bases; the stem is erect until the fruit matures and then sags to a pendent cluster. Of all species in the genus it is probably the most hardy to cold. It is found only in the Federated States of Micronesia. It is threatened by habitat destruction.

References

External links
 
 
 
 
 

amicarum
Endemic flora of the Federated States of Micronesia
Vulnerable plants
Taxa named by Odoardo Beccari
Taxonomy articles created by Polbot